Helena Majdaniec (5 October 1941 – 18 January 2002) was a Polish big beat singer and film actor, "the queen of Polish Twist". Helena Majdaniec cooperated with Niebiesko-Czarni, Czerwono-Czarni, Karin Stanek, Olivia Newton-John, Cliff Richard and Demis Roussos. She performed mainly in Szczecin and Paris.

Personal discography
Her singing is also available in the albums of the music groups she cooperated with.
1973 – Helena Majdanec, pocztówka, R-0141-II Ruch
1970 – Helena Madanec 10", Philips N049, France
1970 – Helena Madanec, 7", Philips 6118007, France
1964 – Helena Majdaniec 7", Polskie Nagrania Muza N-0338

References

1941 births
2002 deaths
People from Volyn Oblast
People from Reichskommissariat Ukraine
Eastern Orthodox Christians from Poland
20th-century Polish women singers